is a Japanese alpine skier. She competed in three events at the 1968 Winter Olympics.

References

External links
 

1946 births
Living people
Japanese female alpine skiers
Olympic alpine skiers of Japan
Alpine skiers at the 1968 Winter Olympics
Sportspeople from Tochigi Prefecture
20th-century Japanese women
21st-century Japanese women